Ferdinando Castiglia (died 1521) was a Roman Catholic prelate who served as Bishop of Bagnoregio (1500–1521).

Biography
On 4 May 1500, Ferdinando Castiglia was appointed during the papacy of Pope Alexander VI as Bishop of Bagnoregio.
He served as Bishop of Bagnoregio until his death in 1521.

While bishop, he was the principal co-consecrator of Stefan Tschugli, Titular Bishop of Belline and Auxiliary Bishop of Chur (1501).

See also 
Catholic Church in Italy

References

External links and additional sources
 (for Chronology of Bishops) 
 (for Chronology of Bishops) 

16th-century Italian Roman Catholic bishops
1521 deaths
Bishops appointed by Pope Alexander VI